Thomas Herbert McIntosh (24 February 1879 – 29 October 1935) was secretary manager of Darlington, Middlesbrough and Everton

Biography 

He played for Darlington before becoming secretary manager in 1902. He moved to Middlesbrough nine years later where new chairman Philip Bach was charged with rebuilding the club following the match-fixing scandal involving the previous chairman Thomas Gibson-Poole and manager Andy Walker. He helped the club achieve their highest ever league position - third in the first division - but with a potential championship team taking shape his plans were interrupted by the outbreak of World War I. During the war, Boro released their players and closed down, while Ayresome Park was used as a munitions store.

McIntosh joined the Teesside Pioneers, a battalion of Alexandra, The Princess of Wales's Own (Yorkshire Regiment), formed in Middlesbrough in December 1914. He saw active service in France as a sergeant. Was commissioned and became 2nd Lieutenant 29 January 1917. When the war ended he guided Boro to the Northern Victory League title and prepared the club for a return to normality. In December 1919, however, an offer came in for his services from Everton and he left with the blessing of the Boro board.

At Everton he was most famous for spotting and signing Dixie Dean. Under McIntosh's guidance Everton won the FA Cup and twice won the Football League Championship. He died from cancer in October 1935, and was eventually replaced as secretary manager at Everton by Theo Kelly.

Honours

As a secretary manager 
Everton
First Division Title winner: 1927–28, 1931–32
Second Division Title winner: 1930–31
FA Charity Shield winner: 1928, 1932
FA Cup winner: 1933
FA Charity Shield runner-up: 1933

Managerial statistics

See also 
 List of English football championship winning managers

External links 
 

1879 births
1935 deaths
English footballers
Darlington F.C. players
Darlington F.C. managers
English football managers
Everton F.C. managers
Middlesbrough F.C. managers
Deaths from cancer in England
Association footballers not categorized by position
British Army personnel of World War I
Green Howards officers